The Independence Visitors' Center (dedicated on May 31, 1971) is a visitors' center owned and operated by the Church of Jesus Christ of Latter-day Saints (LDS Church) in Independence, Missouri. The center is situated on the Greater Temple Lot dedicated and purchased by Joseph Smith and his associates in 1831, only a few yards from the Church of Christ (Temple Lot)'s headquarters and the Community of Christ temple.

History
The property upon which the visitors' center stands was first purchased on December 19, 1831, by Edward Partridge, acting on behalf of Smith. It was repurchased by the LDS Church, which had become the largest of several different Latter Day Saint denominations, on April 14, 1904. The purchase was completed by James G. Duffin, who was president of the church's Central States Mission, acting on behalf of the First Presidency.

A few months later, the Kansas City Times published a rumor (but corrected itself the next day) that the so-called "Utah Mormons" had secretly purchased the entire Greater Temple Lot, including that portion owned by the Church of Christ (Temple Lot), which had been the subject of a lawsuit in the 1890s between the Temple Lot church and the Reorganized Church of Jesus Christ of Latter Day Saints (RLDS Church). The portion owned by the Temple Lot church was the highest-altitude  portion of the  originally purchased by Partridge in December 1831, and had been repurchased by Granville Hedrick, founder of the Temple Lot church, between 1867 and 1877.  Both pieces of real estate are often confused, because since 1867 both the  area and the larger  area have been described in newspaper and other media reports as the "Mormon Temple Lot." A January 2009 online article by Community of Christ researcher John C. Hamer entitled "The Temple Lot: Visions and Realities" helps clear up the confusion.

The visitors' center opened in 1971, the same year as another particularly notable LDS visitors' center in 
Nauvoo, Illinois. Its style of presenting LDS Church beliefs and doctrines in a modern audio-visual and interactive format was the brainchild of Bernard P. Brockbank, a church general authority, who had overseen implementation of the same style at the 1964 New York World's Fair.

Theories on future use
The visitors' center is alleged to have been designed after the Parthenon, one of the world's most renowned temples. This has fueled speculation as to whether the visitors' center is a temple constructed on the Greater Temple Lot dedicated and purchased by Smith and his associates for that purpose in 1831. An October 1952 Kansas City Times essay written by a friend and admirer of RLDS Church Historian Heman C. Smith (1850–1919) published the rumor that the LDS Church intended to build a temple on the site today occupied by the center. In his 2004 book Images of New Jerusalem author Craig  S. Campbell examines the rumor, but is skeptical that the building may be "converted someday" into a temple.

References

External links
 The Church of Jesus Christ of Latter-day Saints Official site

Religious buildings and structures completed in 1971
Buildings and structures in Independence, Missouri
Properties of the Church of Jesus Christ of Latter-day Saints
The Church of Jesus Christ of Latter-day Saints in Missouri
Temple Lot
Tourist attractions in Jackson County, Missouri
Latter Day Saint church buildings
Museums in Jackson County, Missouri
Religious museums in Missouri
Mormon museums in the United States